The River  Deel is in County Cork and County Limerick, Ireland.

The river rises near Dromina in north County Cork and flows north into County Limerick for over 60 km to enter the Shannon Estuary.

After it rises it passes the flowing areas, first Milford and down towards Belville bridge, then on to Castlemahon (Mahoonagh) and nearby Newcastle West, running parallel to the main Limerick-Killarney N21 road, to reach Rathkeale.

After leaving Rathkeale, the river crosses the N21 and flows north to Askeaton. It then crosses the N69 before entering the Shannon Estuary a further 4km north.

Name
The Deel derives its name from daol, an Irish word for a beetle, insect or worm, because of its winding, bending shape.

Fishing
The Deel was once a good salmon and grilse fishery but now is mainly fished for brown trout.

References

External links

 Deel River Guide

Rivers of County Limerick
Tributaries of the River Shannon